The Scottish Unofficial Championship was the top league of Scotland's best amateur rugby union clubs. The Championship was 'unofficial' as the Scottish Rugby Union held that the sport should remain amateur and at the time did not sanction competitive games between the clubs.

History

Numerous forms of football were played in Scotland in the years prior to the introduction of the Rugby rules which were adopted for the boys of Edinburgh Academy in the early 1850s. The game spread to Merchiston and the Royal High School with inter school games beginning in 1858. In 1857 the former pupils of Edinburgh Academy formed the first club in Scotland. The game spread and by the end of the 1860s the Academicals opponents included Edinburgh University, St Andrews University, the Merchistonians, Royal HSFP, West of Scotland FC, Glasgow Academicals, Edinburgh Wanderers and Glasgow University.

The basis of the championship

As inter club games became more commonplace in the mid-1860s the club with the most successful record in club matches was recognised as the Scottish club champion on an unofficial basis. By the 1870s the Scotsman newspaper would declare the champion Scottish club in its annual review of the football season. The championship was always awarded on the basis of the results between the teams in the championship table only which meant that games against clubs from England or further afield were not counted. Up until 1939 the honour was awarded to the club with the fewest defeats, which led to several seasons where the championship was shared. After 1945 it became more commonplace to determine the champion club based on the percentage of games won.

Early years

The Edinburgh Academicals won the first five championships by virtue of being undefeated in club games between 1865–66 and 1869–70. The Academicals retained the championship in 1870–71 as a result of having the best record amongst the Scottish clubs despite the loss of two matches. Glasgow Academicals won the inaugural fixture with the Edinburgh Academicals in 1871–72, and, by remaining undefeated in their other fixtures wrested the championship from Edinburgh for the first time.

Twentieth century

The championship grew over the course of its history as more clubs attained ‘first class status’. In 1909 the championship was contested by eight Edinburgh clubs, seven Glasgow clubs and seven in the Borders. Edinburgh District was represented by Edinburgh Academicals, Royal HSFP, Edinburgh Institution FP, Watsonians, Edinburgh University, Edinburgh Wanderers, Stewarts FP & Heriots FP. The Glasgow District clubs were Glasgow Academicals, Clydesdale, Greenock Wanderers, West of Scotland, Kelvinside Academicals, Glasgow HSFP and Glasgow University whilst the Border representatives were Hawick, Gala, Jed-Forest Melrose, Selkirk, Kelso and Langholm.

Hillhead HSFP joined the championship in 1913–14 which was to be the last championship season for Clydesdale who were unable to continue after the first world war. The championship was unchanged until 1929 when Dunfermline became the first club from the North & Midlands to be included. The 1930s saw St Andrew's University added to the championship in 1936–37, Edinburgh Institution FP renamed as Melville College FP, following the school's relocation in 1937–38, and in 1938–39 Hutcheson's GSFP and Allan Glen's FP ascended to the championship with Allan Glen's heading the table in their first season.

The post war years saw Kelvinside and West of Scotland combine until 1950–51 whilst Musselburgh and Aberdeen GSFP were newcomers to the championship. By the middle of the decade Boroughmuir FP had joined the table with Trinity Academicals, Jordanhill and Ayr following in the 1960s. By 1972–73, the final season prior to the introduction of league rugby, Leith Academicals, Broughton FP and Perthshire were recognised as championship clubs.

Scottish Unofficial Champions 1865–66 to 1972–73

1865–66 Edinburgh Academicals
1866–67 Edinburgh Academicals
1867–68 Edinburgh Academicals
1868–69 Edinburgh Academicals
1869–70 Edinburgh Academicals
1870–71 Edinburgh Academicals
1871–72 Glasgow Academicals
1872–73 Glasgow Academicals
1873–74 Glasgow Academicals
1874–75 Edinburgh Academicals
1875–76 Glasgow Academicals
1876–77 Edinburgh Academicals & Glasgow Academicals
1877–78 Edinburgh Academicals
1878–79 Edinburgh Academicals & Glasgow Academicals
1879–80 Edinburgh Academicals & Glasgow Academicals
1880–81 Edinburgh Institution
1881–82 Edinburgh Institution
1882–83 West of Scotland
1883–84 Royal HSFP
1884–85 West of Scotland
1885–86 Edinburgh Academicals
1886–87 Edinburgh Academicals
1887–88 Edinburgh Academicals
1888–89 West of Scotland
1889–90 West of Scotland
1890–91 West of Scotland
1891–92 Watsonians & West of Scotland
1892–93 Watsonians
1893–94 Watsonians
1894–95 Watsonians & West of Scotland
1895–96 Hawick
1896–97 Clydesdale, Jedforest & Watsonians
1897–98 Edinburgh Academicals
1898–99 Edinburgh Academicals
1899–1900 Edinburgh Academicals, Edinburgh University & Hawick
1900–01 Edinburgh University
1901–02 Edinburgh University & Watsonians
1902–03 Edinburgh University & Glasgow Academicals
1903–04 Glasgow Academicals
1904–05 Glasgow Academicals
1905–06 Edinburgh Academicals
1906–07 Jedforest
1907–08 Edinburgh University
1908–09 Hawick & Watsonians
1909–10 Watsonians
1910–11 Watsonians
1911–12 Edinburgh University & Watsonians
1912–13 Glasgow Academicals
1913–14 Watsonians
1919–20 Heriots
1920–21 Watsonians
1921–22 Glasgow Academicals
1922–23 Heriots
1923–24 Glasgow Academicals & Glasgow HSFP
1924–25 Glasgow Academicals
1925–26 Glasgow Academicals
1926–27 Hawick
1927–28 Heriots
1928–29 Heriots
1929–30 Edinburgh Academicals
1930–31 Dunfermline
1931–32 Gala
1932–33 Dunfermline & Hawick
1933–34 Hillhead HSFP & Royal HSFP
1934–35 Watsonians
1935–36 Glasgow HSFP
1936–37 Hillhead HSFP & Watsonians
1937–38 Stewart's College FP
1938–39 Allan Glen's
1946–47 Stewart's College FP
1947–48 Aberdeen GSFP
1948–49 Hawick
1949–50 Heriots
1950–51 Glasgow HSFP
1951–52 Melrose
1952–53 Selkirk
1953–54 Glasgow HSFP
1954–55 Hawick
1955–56 Edinburgh Academicals
1956–57 Gala
1957–58 Stewart's College FP
1958–59 Langholm
1959–60 Hawick
1960–61 Hawick
1961–62 Glasgow HSFP
1962–63 Melrose
1963–64 Hawick
1964–65 Hawick & West of Scotland
1965–66 Hawick
1966–67 Melrose
1967–68 Hawick
1968–69 Jordanhill
1969–70 Watsonians
1970–71 West of Scotland
1971–72 Hawick
1972–73 Boroughmuir

Scottish Unofficial Championship wins by club

 Edinburgh Academicals 16 & 4 shared
 Glasgow Academicals 10 & 5 shared
 Hawick 10 & 4 shared
 Watsonians 8 & 7 shared
 West of Scotland 6 & 3 shared
 Heriots 5
 Glasgow HSFP 4 & 1 shared
 Edinburgh University 2 & 4 shared
Melrose 3
Stewart's College FP 3
Edinburgh Institution 2
Gala 2
Dunfermline 1 & 1 shared
Jedforest 1 & 1 shared
Royal HSFP 1 & 1 shared
Aberdeen GSFP 1
 Allan Glen's 1
Boroughmuir 1
Jordanhill 1
Langholm 1
Selkirk 1
Hillhead HSFP 2 shared
 Clydesdale 1 shared

The end of the Scottish Unofficial Championship

The SRU committee in 1973 decided that the structure of the club game needed changing; and introduced a competitive six league structure for its clubs. This became the first officially sanctioned league structure in the world.

In season 1973-74 the new Scottish League Championship began; the top league of this championship is the Scottish Premiership.

References

 
Rugby union leagues in Scotland
Sports leagues established in 1865
Sports leagues disestablished in 1973